George Paton (born May 5, 1970) is an American football executive who is the general manager of the Denver Broncos of the National Football League (NFL). Paton previously served as the assistant general manager and vice president of player personnel for the Minnesota Vikings and served with the Vikings in various executive roles for 14 seasons. Paton began his NFL career as a scout for the Chicago Bears before serving as the director of pro personnel for the Miami Dolphins from 2001 to 2006 and joining the Vikings in 2007. 

Paton played college football at UCLA and later professionally in Europe in the Austrian Football League and Italian Football League.

Early years
A native of La Cañada Flintridge, California, Paton played quarterback at Loyola High School (Los Angeles), and was a four year letter winner at defensive back for the UCLA from 1988 to 1991, being a part of a pair of Bruin bowl teams. While at UCLA, Paton earned a bachelor's degree in history.

Europe
In 1992, Paton played in the Italian Football League. In 1993, Paton played in the Austrian Football League with the Vienna Vikings. The team reached the semi finals of the league playoffs.

Executive career

Chicago Bears
In 1997, Paton began his executive career with the Chicago Bears in their scouting and personnel department, eventually rising up to the position of assistant director of pro personnel in 2000.

Miami Dolphins
In 2001, Paton was hired by the Miami Dolphins as their director of pro personnel.

Minnesota Vikings
In 2007, Paton was hired as the director of player personnel for the Minnesota Vikings, reuniting with the Vikings vice president of player personnel, Rick Spielman, who worked with Paton in Miami and Chicago. When Spielman was promoted to the Vikings general manager in 2012, Paton was promoted to be assistant general manager. In 2019, Paton was given an additional role as vice president of player personnel.

Denver Broncos
On January 12, 2021, Paton was named the general manager of the Denver Broncos.

Personal life
The son of a high school football coach,Paton is married to Barbara. They have two children, a daughter, Bella and a son, Beau.

References

External links
Denver Broncos bio

Denver Broncos executives
National Football League general managers
Minnesota Vikings executives
Chicago Bears scouts
Miami Dolphins executives
UCLA Bruins football players
Living people
American expatriate players of American football
American expatriate sportspeople in Italy
American expatriate sportspeople in Austria
American football defensive backs
All Wikipedia articles written in American English
All stub articles
1970 births